Ireland competed at the 1972 Summer Olympics in Munich, West Germany. 59 competitors, 51 men and 8 women, took part in 54 events in 12 sports. No Irish athletes received an Olympic medal in their sport.

Athletics

Men's 400 metres
Fanaghan McSweeney
 Heat — 47.1 (→ did not advance)

Men's 800 metres
Frank Murphy
 Heat — 1:51.1
 Semifinals — 1:49.2 (→ did not advance)

Men's 1.500 metres
Frank Murphy
 Heat — 3:43.3 (→ did not advance)

Men's 5.000 metres
Michael Keogh
 Heat — 13:57.8 (→ did not advance)

John Hartnett
 Heat — 14:34.6 (→ did not advance)

Men's 10.000 metres
Neil Cusack
 Heat — 28:45.8 (→ did not advance)

Men's 3.000 metres Steeplechase
Edward Leddy
 Heat — 8:47.4 (→ did not advance)

Men's Marathon
Danny McDaid
 Final — 2:22:25 (→ 23rd place)

Des McGann
 Final — 2:28:31 (→ 42nd place)

Donie Walsh
 Final — 2:31:12 (→ 47th place)

Men's Shot Put
Phil Conway
 Qualifying Round — 16.69 m (→ did not advance)

Women's 800 metres
Claire Walsh
 Heat — 2:08.98 (→ did not advance)

Mary Tracey
 Heat — 2:04.18 (→ did not advance)

Women's 1.500 metres
Mary Tracey
 Heat — 4:16.43 (→ national record, did not advance)

Women's 100m Hurdles
Margaret Murphy
 Heat — 15.89 m (→ did not advance)

Women's Pentathlon
Margaret Murphy
 Final ranking — 3770 pts (→ 27th place)

Boxing

Men's Welterweight 67 kg   Joe Darcy unable to compete due to injury.

Men's Light Middleweight (– 71 kg)
Christopher Elliott

 First Round — Bye 
 Second Round — Defeated Farouk Kesrouan (LEB), 5:0

 Third Round — Lost to Emeterio Villanueva (MEX), TKO-3

Canoeing

Cycling

Four cyclists represented Ireland in 1972.

Individual road race
 Liam Horner — 38th place
 Kieron McQuaid — 40th place
 Peter Doyle — 69th place
 Noel Taggart — did not finish (→ no ranking)

Team time trial
 Liam Horner
 Peter Doyle
 Kieron McQuaid
 Noel Taggart

Equestrian

Fencing

One fencer represented Ireland in 1972.

Men's foil
 John Bouchier-Hayes

Men's épée
 John Bouchier-Hayes

Judo

Rowing

Men's Single Sculls
Seán Drea
Heat — 7:47.64
Repechage — 7:50.27
Semi Finals — 8:27.70 
B-Final — 7:55.33 (→ 7th place)

Sailing

Shooting

Four male shooters represented Ireland in 1972.

Trap
 Dermot Kelly
 Gerry Brady

Skeet
 William Campbell
 Arthur McMahon

Swimming

Men's 100m Freestyle
Andrew Hunter
 Heat — 56.09s (→  did not advance)

Frank Rothwell Weightlifting Frank Rothwell

References

Nations at the 1972 Summer Olympics
1972 Summer Olympics
1972 in Irish sport